2005 WAFF U-15 Championship was the first edition of the WAFF U-15 Championship. A WAFF youth football championship organised by the West Asian Football Federation (WAFF) for the men's under-15 national teams of West Asia. It was held in Karaj, Iran from 23 August to 29 July 2005.

Format
The groups winner and the second-placed team of the two groups in the first round played in a single round-robin format, qualified for the semi-finals.

Participating nations
6 West Asian Federation teams entered the competition.

Group stage

Group A

Group B

Knockout stage

Bracket

Semi-finals

Fifth place

Third place

Final

Champion

Final standing

References

External links 
 WAFF official website

WAFF U-15 Championship
2005 in Iranian sport